Moody Pike, the second studio album from Pale Horse and Rider, featured Gerald Menke (ex-Mercury Rev), Mike Pride, as well as Palace Brothers' Paul Oldham. This was the last recording from the group as its members have gone on to focus on other projects.

Track listing
 "Stoned In The Evening" – 3:51
 "Lovely Lace" – 2:04
 "Bruises Like Badges" – 4:21
 "Quarters" – 3:20
 "Annabelle" – 4:45
 "In The Cold Of Your Room" – 3:02
 "Weight Of My Soul" – 7:40
 "Winter Slides" – 4:17
 "Route 224" – 3:01
 "The Drinking Boy" – 5:17

References

2004 albums
Pale Horse and Rider albums
Darla Records albums